David J. Pine is an American physicist who has made contributions in the field of soft matter physics, including studies on colloids, polymers, surfactant systems, and granular materials. He is Professor of Physics in the NYU College of Arts and Science and Chair of the Department of Chemical and Biomolecular Engineering at the NYU Tandon School of Engineering.

A professor of physics and founding director of the Center for Soft Matter Research at New York University (NYU), Pine is one of the original developers of diffusing-wave spectroscopy, an optical technique that has proven useful to study colloid systems. Pine also has a longstanding interest in colloidal self-assembly and in the development of a broad range of colloids for these purposes, including colloidal templating, colloidal clusters, lock-and-key colloids, and patchy colloids with valence. He also discovered Random Organization, a nonequilibrium phase transition in which the hydrodynamic reversibility of slow flows breaks down.

Pine has published over 150 articles and has received numerous fellowships and honors. In 2000, his work was recognized with the Society of Rheology Publication of the Year Award. He was a Guggenheim Fellow (1999-2000) and is a Fellow of the American Academy of Arts and Sciences (2018), the American Association for the Advancement of Science (2000), and the American Physical Society (1997) for "the development of light scattering techniques, including diffusing-wave spectroscopy, and their application to the study of complex fluids".

Prior to working at NYU, Pine was a professor in the Chemical Engineering Department and the Materials Department at the University of California, Santa Barbara (UCSB) for 10 years; he served as chair of the Chemical Engineering Department from 2001 to 2004. He also worked as a research scientist at Exxon Corporate Research in Annandale, New Jersey, and was on the physics faculty at Haverford College near Philadelphia.

Pine received his B.S. in Physics and Mathematics in 1975 from Wheaton College, and his Ph.D. in Physics in 1982 from Cornell University.

References

Living people
21st-century American physicists
New York University faculty
Fellows of the American Association for the Advancement of Science
Fellows of the American Physical Society
University of California, Santa Barbara faculty
Wheaton College (Illinois) alumni
Cornell University alumni
Polytechnic Institute of New York University faculty
Year of birth missing (living people)